Bombay Legislative Council was the legislature of the Bombay Province and later the upper house of the bicameral legislature of Bombay Province in British India and the Indian state of Bombay.

History
The Indian Councils Act 1861 set up the Bombay Legislative Council as an advisory body through which the colonial administration obtained advice and assistance. The Act empowered the provincial Governor to nominate four non-English Indian members to the council for the first time. Under the Act, the nominated members were allowed to move their own bills and vote on bills introduced in the council. However, they were not allowed to question the executive, move resolutions or examine the budget and not interfere with the laws passed by the Central Legislature. The Governor was also the president of the Council and he had complete authority over when, where and how long to convene the Council and what to discuss. Two members of his Executive Council and the Advocate-General of Bombay were also allowed to participate and vote in the Council.

The first meeting of the erstwhile Legislative Council of the then Bombay Province was held on 22 January 1862 at the Durbar Hall of the Town Hall in Bombay. The meeting was then chaired by the then Governor, Sir George Russell Clerk. The first five Indian members of the council were chosen such that three of them did not know English.

In 1892, the role of the Council was expanded by the Indian Councils Act 1892 and increased the total number of members of the Council to twenty. The non-official members were to be nominated from the Bombay Municipal Corporation, the Fellows of Bombay University, the Chamber of Commerce of Bombay, the Chamber of Commerce of Karachi, the zamindars of Sind, the sardars of the Deccan, the municipalities of the Northern Division, the local boards of the Southern Division and three representatives of the Central Division. The Council could discuss the annual financial statement and ask questions subject to certain limitations.

The Indian Councils Act 1909 officially introduced the method of electing members to the Council, but did not provide for direct election of the members. It abolished automatic official (executive) majorities in the Council and gave its members the power to move resolutions upon matters of general public interest and the budget and also to ask supplementary questions.

Based on the recommendations of the Montague-Chelmsford report, the Government of India Act of 1919 was enacted. The Act enlarged the Bombay legislative council and increased the strength of elected members to be greater than that of nominated and official members. It introduced a system of dyarchy in the Provinces.

The Government of India Act of 1935 abolished dyarchy and established provincial autonomy. It created a bicameral legislature in the Bombay province. The Legislature consisted of the Governor and two Legislative bodies - a Legislative Assembly and a Legislative Council. The Council was a permanent body not subject to dissolution by the Governor and one-third of its members retired every three years.

After India became independent in 1947 and the Indian Constitution was adopted in 1950, the Legislative Council continued to be the upper chamber of the legislature of the Bombay State.

The legislature of Bombay State ceased to exist in 1960 after the bifurcation of Bombay into Maharashtra and Gujarat.

List of members (1862-1909)

Indian Councils Act 1909
The Indian Councils Act 1909 expanded the strength of the legislative council to 49 (including the Governor) and introduced the indirect election of members to the Council. The legislative council was composed of
 Ex-officio members (4):  Executive council members (3) and the Advocate-General (1)
 Nominated members (21): Officials (up to 14), Experts (2) and Non-Officials
 Elected members (21): Bombay Municipal Corporation (1), Municipalities (4), University of Bombay (1), Landholders (3), Muslims (4), Bombay Chamber of Commerce (1), Karachi Chamber of Commerce (1), Millowners' associations of Bombay (1) and Ahmadabad (1) and the Indian commercial community (1).
Rafiuddin Ahmed, Sir Chinubhai Ranchhodlal, Lallubhai Shamaldas Mehta (1910-1912), R. P. Paranjpe (1912-1915), Sir Gokuldas Parekh (1912-1915), Vithalbhai Patel (1913-1920), Dinshaw Edulji Wacha (1915), Balkrishna Sitaram Kamat, Wadero Ghulam Kadir Dayo,(1913-1920) and Chunilal Mehta (1916) were among the notable members.

Government of India Act 1919
The Government of India Act of 1919 which introduced the concept of diarchy in the province further enlarged the council and gave the elected members a majority.

The composition of the Council was as follows:
Nominated Members
Ex-officio Members of the Governor's Executive Council
Nominated Officials (25)
Nominated from special interest groups (5): Anglo-Indians, Indian Christians, Labour, Depressed Classes, Cotton Trade
Elected Members (86)
Non-Muhammadan (General) (46):
Urban (11): Bombay City (North) (3), Bombay City (South) (3), Karachi, Ahmedabad, Surat, Sholapur, Poona
Rural (35): Ahmedabad (2), Broach, Kaira (2), Panch Mahals, Surat (2), Thana (2), Ahmednagar (2), East Khandesh (3), Nasik (2), Poona (2), Satara (3), Belgaum (2), Bijapur, Dharwar (2), Kanara, Ratnagiri (2), Eastern Sind, Western Sind, Sholapur, Kolaba, West Khandesh
Muhammadan (27):
Urban (5): Bombay City (2), Karachi City, Ahmedabad & Surat, Poona & Sholapur
Rural (22): Northern Division (3), Central Division (3), Southern Division (3), Hyderabad (2), Karachi (2), Larkana (3), Sukkur (2), Thar & Parkar (2), Nawebshah, Upper Sind Frontier
European (2): Bombay City, Presidency
Landholders (3): Deccan Sardars, Gujarat Sardars, Sind Jagirdars & Zamindars
University (1): University of Bombay
Commerce & Industry (7): Bombay Chamber of Commerce (2), Karachi Chamber of Commerce, Bombay Trades Association, Bombay Millowners' Association, Ahmedabad Millowners' Association, Indian Merchants' Chamber & Bureau

7 of the constituencies were reserved for Marathas.

Indians were elected as the President of the Council such as N. G. Chandavarkar (1921-1923), Ibrahim Rahimtullah (1923) and Ali Muhammad Khan Dehlavi (1927).

See also
List of Governors of Bombay
1937 Bombay Presidency elections
Bombay Legislative Assembly

References

Bombay Presidency
State upper houses in India
Defunct upper houses in India
Bombay State
Legislatures of British India